Mini Mansions is the debut album by Los Angeles band Mini Mansions. It was released on November 2, 2010.

Track listing
 "Vignette #1" (1:27)
 "The Room Outside" (4:20)
 "Crime of the Season" (4:44)
 "Monk" (4:03)
 "Wunderbars" (3:03)
 "Seven Sons" (3:06)
 "Vignette #2" (2:16)
 "Kiddie Hypnogogia" (2:56)
 "Majik Marker" (4:04)
 "Girls" (3:24)
 "Vignette #3" (2:00)
 "Thriller Escapade" (4:29)

Personnel
Personnel adapted from album liner notes.
Mini Mansions
 Tyler Parkford
 Zach Dawes
 Michael Shuman

Production
 Mini Mansions - production
 Tyler Parkford - artwork
 Rueben Cohen - mastering
 Justin Smith - recording, mixing (tracks 1, 2, 6, 8, 9, and 11)
 Josh Homme - mixing (tracks 3–5)
 Biff Dawes - mixing (tracks 7, 10, and 12)

References

External links

2010 debut albums
Mini Mansions albums